Wanneroo Secondary College is an Independent Public secondary school in Wanneroo, a suburb  north of Perth, Western Australia.

Overview
The school was established as Wanneroo High School in 1977, starting out with 180 Year 8 students. At the time, the school was the northernmost high school in Perth, with students coming from as far as Yanchep. In 1987, David John Holthouse, a student at Wanneroo Senior High School won the Beazley Medal, the most prestigious academic award for secondary school students in Western Australia. By 1988, the school had changed name to Wanneroo Senior High School. The school was renamed again in 2013 to Wanneroo Secondary College, coinciding with it becoming an Independent Public School.

In May 2012, an upgrade was announced to give the school adequate facilities for the transition of Year 7 students to high school in 2015. The $4.34 million upgrade was opened in May 2014, under the original $6.2 million budget. It included five new classrooms, a new science laboratory and science preparation area, computer hub and staffroom. In 2015, the school opened to Year 7 students for the first time, alongside most other public high schools in Western Australia.

In December 2019, construction started on an upgrade to sports facilities at Wanneroo Secondary College. The $5 million upgrade included a new sports hall and improvements to existing tennis courts. The upgrade was one of Labor's 2017 election commitments. It was completed in November 2020, a month ahead of schedule.

There are currently plans for the previous sports hall to be converted into a performing arts centre, and for the existing cafeteria to be refurbished. An architect was appointed in November 2020, and construction is scheduled to start in October 2021, with completion planned a year later. It will cost $5 million and include a theatre with 250 retractable seats, a music and drama studio, green rooms, a bio box, a general learning area, store rooms, a staff office and landscaping.

Programs
Wanneroo Secondary College has two Department of Education endorsed specialist programs. They are for Australian rules football and specialist performing arts.

Local intake area
Wanneroo Secondary College's local intake area covers Ashby, Gnangara, Hocking, Jandabup, Pearsall, Sinagra and Wanneroo. Students in the local intake area have a guaranteed place at the school if they apply. Students outside the local intake area can apply to the school, and they will be accepted on a case-by-case basis.

Academic results

Student numbers

Notable alumni
 Sabine Winton – Labor member for Wanneroo
 Sally Hunter - Commonwealth Games silver medallist for swimming, two time Olympic representative

See also

 List of schools in the Perth metropolitan area

References

External links
 Annual school reports (2012 – 2018)
 Annual school reports (2007 – 2011)

Public high schools in Perth, Western Australia
Educational institutions established in 1977
1977 establishments in Australia
Wanneroo, Western Australia